Zinc finger protein 749 is a protein that in humans is encoded by the ZNF749 gene.

References

Further reading 

Zinc finger proteins